Jerónimo Rodríguez Guemes (born 24 March 1999) is a Mexican professional footballer who plays as a left-back.

Club career
Rodríguez made his professional debut with Pumas UNAM on August 26, 2020, in a win against Querétaro.

Career statistics

Club

References

Mexican footballers
Club Universidad Nacional footballers
Association football defenders
Footballers from Mexico City
1999 births
Living people